Nigerian Shippers' Council is an agency of the Federal Government of Nigeria. The council is responsible for protecting exporters and importers in Nigeria as well as its goods. The Agency is an affiliation of Nigerian Ports Authority and were under the supervision of Ministry of Transportation (Nigeria). The council focus on importing and exporting of cargo with regards to port-to-port shipment through the chain of transportation. Its mandate is to establish an effective environment for all Nigerian stakeholders by putting sufficient and good economic regulatory system in Nigerian Port transportation sector.

History 
The Nigerian Shippers’ Council was established in the year 1978, with the help of UNCTAD, by the law of Nigerian Shippers’ Council Act Cap. N133 LFN 2004.

Regulations 
The council works based on The Federal Government Port Reform Agenda and it is under Port Economic Regulator of February 2014 and was affirmed by the Ministerial Regulation: Nigerian Shippers’ Council (Port Economic) Regulations 2015; and the Presidential Order: Nigerian Shippers’ Council (Port Economic Regulator) Order, 2015.

External link 
Official Website

See also 
Nigerian Ports Authority

References 

Organizations based in Lagos
Transport authorities in Nigeria
Water transport in Nigeria